Lucie is a Norwegian drama film from 1979 directed by Jan Erik Düring. It stars Inger Lise Rypdal, Gösta Ekman, Kari Simonsen, and Nils Sletta. The film is based on Amalie Skram's novel Lucie, which dealt with the conditions and limitations of women at the end of the 19th century in Norway.

Plot
In the second half of the 19th century, Kristiania (now Oslo) offered a varied entertainment life. There were a number of variety theaters, and the city also had its own brothel district. Prostitution was legal, and it was considered justified for a woman to obtain financial and other benefits from her body and physical advantages.

The beautiful variety theater actress Lucie (played by Inger Lise Rypdal) is certainly aware of this fact. She has made the acquaintance of the lawyer Gerner (Gösta Ekman), a fine and educated gentleman in the city. This all develops into an erotic relationship, and Lucie knows how to play on Gerner's jealousy and masculine pride. She eventually manages to marry into good society, but it proves difficult to be accepted without the right class background. Her life does not turn out as she expected and, after a pregnancy in which the relationship with her husband is constantly deteriorating, she dies in childbirth.

Reception
The film received a mixed reception from both Aftenposten's and Dagbladet's reviewers. Aftenposten's Øyvind Thorsen wrote, among other things: "It is my opinion that the first half of the film is very stagnant; sometimes one gets a little depressed by boredom as well," but he concluded by writing: "A film to be depressed by, but fortunately first and foremost because of its tragic content." Dagbladet's Thor Ellingsen also expressed mixed enthusiasm and wrote, among other things: "I find Lucie significantly better than what advance statements have wanted it to be. In fact, I had thought it was much worse." But he also suggests that Rypdal's performance pulls the film down: "Rypdal's remarks often seem flat and 'modern' in an illusion-breaking way."

Cast

 Inger Lise Rypdal as Lucie 
 Gösta Ekman as Gerner 
 Rut Tellefsen as Karen Reinertsen 
 Kari Simonsen as Nilsa 
 Nils Sletta as Olsen 
 Sigrid Huun as Henny 
 Alf Nordvang as Dr. Mørk 
 Unni Evjen as Mrs. Mørk 
 Karin Helene Haugen as the housekeeper
 Siri Rom as the midwife
 Arne Bang-Hansen as Brandt 
 Elisabeth Høye as a street prostitute
 Peter Lindgren as the rapist
 Svein Tindberg as Knut 
 Ingeborg Cook

References

External links 
 
 Lucie at the National Library of Norway
 Lucie at the Swedish Film Database

1979 films
Norwegian drama films
1970s Norwegian-language films
1979 drama films
Films directed by Jan Erik Düring